PZL.56 Kania (buzzard) was a Polish pre-war initial project of a fighter aircraft designed by Wsiewołod Jakimiuk of the PZL works. A single-seat low-wing monoplane was a development of PZL.50 Jastrząb fighter, modified to house a new Hispano-Suiza 12Y engine, then under development in France.

While PZL.50 Jastrząb's prototype proved to be an excellent fighter, it was seriously underpowered as modern engines of sufficient power were still unavailable at the time of its construction. Its PZL-Bristol Merkury VIII engine (a license-built copy of Bristol Mercury VIIIA) had only  of power, with emergency power reaching . At the same time the engineers at the French Hispano-Suiza company announced, that their line of engines marketed as Hispano-Suiza 12Y would reach  of power in two to three years. Such engines would be sufficient to power the PZL.50, or any other similar fighter design considered by the Polish construction bureaus at the time. To prepare for the arrival of new engines, the PZL works organised an internal competition for a redesign of PZL.50 from a large radial engine to a smaller, more streamlined in-line engine. Poland also wanted to buy a license for even stronger engines of the new Hispano-Suiza 12Z line that would ultimately replace the 12Y series.

The contest was won in August 1939 by Wsiewołod Jakimiuk. The resulting design was an all-metal, low-wing fighter aircraft, with retractable landing gear and tail wheel. The plane was to be armed with a single 20mm gun firing through the propeller shaft and four 7.9 mm machine guns in the wings. The projected speed was to exceed . Project prepared in August 1939 was rejected in favour of PZL.55 designed by Jerzy Dąbrowski.

Jakimiuk was also responsible for development work on the PZL 11 fighter that equipped front line Polish squadrons in September, 1939, and after the war was a member of the de Havilland Canada team that designed the successful Beaver and Chipmunk bush planes.



Planned specifications (PZL.56 Kania)

General characteristics
 Crew: 1
 Powerplant: 1× Hispano-Suiza 12Y inline engine, 1100 hp

Performance
 Maximum speed: 760 km/h

See also

References

Bibliography

 Glass, Andrzej. Polskie Konstrukcje Lotnicze Vol.3 (In Polish). Sandomierz, Poland: Wydawnictwo Stratus, 2008.
 Liss, . The PZL 11 (Aircraft in Profile number 75). Leatherhead, Surrey, UK: Profile Publications Ltd., 1966. 

1930s Polish fighter aircraft
World War II Polish fighter aircraft
PZL aircraft
Low-wing aircraft